Ricochet is a wild mouse roller coaster located at Carowinds in Charlotte, North Carolina. It opened for the 2002 season. The roller coaster is located in the Carolina Boardwalk section of the park.

History
On October 23, 2001, Carowinds announced that they would be adding Ricochet. It would be the park's 11th roller coaster. The new ride would also be part of a new Carolina Boardwalk section. 

Ricochet officially opened on March 23, 2002.

Facts
Ricochet at Carowinds is a Compact park model. It received a new paint job for the 2014 season, consisting of blue supports and green track. 

 Height - 
 Speed -  
 Duration - 1:50
 Length - 
 Capacity - 1120 riders per hour
 Cars - 8 cars. Riders are arranged 2 across in 2 rows for a total of 4 riders per car.

Ride experience
Riders exit the station before taking a sharp turn and up a  chain lift into multiple 180° hairpin turns. Then, riders go up a small hill, take a sharp turn, and go down the biggest drop on the ride. After that, riders go up a hill and turn into two bunny hills, the second of which features the coaster's on-ride photo. Riders then turn into one more dip that leads into the brakes.

References

External links
 Official site at Carowinds

Roller coasters in North Carolina
Roller coasters operated by Cedar Fair
Roller coasters introduced in 2002
Carowinds
2002 establishments in North Carolina